Prince Sultan Military Medical City (PSMMC) also known as Riyadh Armed Forces Hospital is located in Riyadh City, the capital of Saudi Arabia, considered one of the most advanced centres in the Middle East. It is located in the heart of Riyadh. PSMMC is part of the Medical Services Department (MSD) of the Ministry of Defense (MOD).

History
Riyadh Military Hospital was founded by King Khalid bin Abdulaziz in December 1978 to meet the demands of capital city Riyadh. He inaugurated the hospital with 385 beds in the first phase. In the second stage at the end of 1979, Al Kharj Military Industries Corporation Hospital was commissioned with 60 beds and at the end of 1983, King Abdulaziz Military Academy was commissioned with 34 beds. Since that time the program has been growing in number of: In 2001, King Fahad National Guard Hospital became part of King Abdulaziz Medical cities. Passing through time and growth of RMH
 Facilities Additional Buildings.
 First iCT Web-based electronic medical records solution for patients and hospital record in the region
 20 dispensaries in all Riyadh Metropolitan Area  Support to 3 dispensaries belonging to Medical Service Department.
 1,192 Beds including A&E, Delivery, NICU & Theater + 48 Dialysis Chairs.
 Support for Prince Sultan Cardiac Center (156 Beds purpose-built Cardiac Center).
 7,179 Staff

Medical specialties
Following are the medical specialist department in the RMH
Psychiatry
Endoscopy
Otorhinolaryngology Head & Neck Surgery
Pathology
Radiology
Ophthalmology

Mission
The Hospital Management is committed in providing the best Healthcare services standard for its patients by
 meeting the expectations of its patients and workers
 full commitment to the principles of Total Quality Management
 providing the optimum support to all employees through effective training
 improving the management operations efficiency
 ensuring a continuous improvement work culture.

Achievements
Riyadh Military Hospital earned a lot of laureates in the field of health and medical sciences. It is the first hospital in Saudi Arabia to publish more than 1600 research articles, trained more than 1017 physicians and 577 paramedics. It is the first-ever renal transplantation center in Saudi Arabia where more than 750 kidney transplants have occurred since its birth and it is the only center of bone marrow transplantation in Saudi Arabia established and working since 1989. RMH is the first and the only hospital to conduct liver transplant, Stereotactic Radio-surgery, computer operated surgery. Epilepsy treatment and surgery at Riyadh Military hospital was started on 1998 and it is the second largest referral program and management in Saudi Arabia. 
In Academics, there are more than 33 fellowship programs, 238 physicians under training, about 20 diploma programs, and 136 trainees too.

Programs
Health Care Students
 Nursing critical care diploma
Nursing academy
Post Graduate Critical care Diploma
Nursing Diploma Program
Staff development program
Medical Studies
Residency in Medicine
Residency in Surgery
Residency in Dentistry
Residency in Emergency Medicine
Residency in Obs and Gyn
Residency in Orthopedic
Residency in Pediatric
Residency in Plastic Surgery
Residency in Psychiatry
Residency in Urology
Residency in Histopathology
Residency in Neurosurgery

See also
 Health care in Saudi Arabia
 List of hospitals in Saudi Arabia

References

External links
Official Website
RMH Intensive Care Unit

Hospital buildings completed in 1978
Military hospitals in Saudi Arabia